Libyan Air Cargo is an inactive cargo airline based in Tripoli, Libya. It is the cargo division of Libyan Airlines, operating all-cargo services. Its main base is Tripoli International Airport. It serves destinations throughout Africa, Europe, and Asia.

History 

The airline was established in 1979 as United African Airlines and rebranded Jamahiriya Air Transport in 1982, it was merged into Libyan Air Cargo in 1993. In 2002, became the first airline outside of Russia and Ukraine to operate the world's second-largest aircraft, the Antonov An-124.

Fleet 
As of June 2019, the Libyan Air Cargo fleet consist of the following. Since the revolution most of them are grounded.

 Antonov An-124-100 5A-DKL Susa, in storage in Ukraine since 2009. The aircraft was threatened by fighting at Sviatoshyn Airfield in the Battle of Kyiv, but  was undamaged.
 One Ilyushin Il-76 5A-DNY

Previously operated
 One Boeing 707-320C, now retired
 Lockheed L-100 Hercules
 Antonov An-124-100 5A-DKN Sabrata, destroyed during heavy fighting in Tripoli in 2019).

References

External links

Airlines of Libya
Airlines established in 1979
Cargo airlines
Economy of Tripoli, Libya